Arne Johansson (born 1950) is a Swedish orienteering competitor. He is three times Relay World Champion as a member of the Swedish winning teams in 1972, 1974 and 1976.

References

1950 births
Living people
Swedish orienteers
Male orienteers
Foot orienteers
World Orienteering Championships medalists